e2 was a Turkish television channel launched in January 2007 that often broadcasts American series. It is owned by the Doğuş Group. The channel closed on January 31, 2016.

Entertainment programmes
The following is an incomplete list of shows which have aired throughout the existence of e2:

 24 
 American Idol 
 Battlestar Galactica 
 Bored to Death 
 Breaking Bad 
 Chuck 
 Cold Case 
 Come Fly with Me 
 Conan 
 CSI: NY 
 Desperate Housewives 
 Dexter 
 Dirt rerun 
 Doctor Who rerun 
 Eastbound & Down 
 Family Guy 
 Five Days 
 Footballers' Wives 
 Gossip Girl rerun  
 Hollyoaks 
 How I Met Your Mother 
 Hung 
 It's Always Sunny in Philadelphia rerun 
 Late Night with Jimmy Fallon 
 Later... with Jools Holland 
 Little Britain USA 
 Lucky Louie 
 Mad Men rerun 
 Married... with Children 
 Martha Stewart Showrerun 
 Masters of Horror 
 Masters of Science Fiction 
 Merlin 
 Mongrels 
 Nightmares and Dreamscapes: From the Stories of Stephen King 
 Nip/Tuck 
 Poker After Dark 
 Prison Break 
 Rachael Ray Show rerun
 Smallville 
 South Park 
 The Closer 
 The Daily Show with Jon Stewart: Global Edition 
 The Ellen DeGeneres Show 
 The New Adventures of Old Christine 
 The O.C. 
 The Pacific 
 The Sarah Silverman Program rerun 
 The Simpsons 
 The Sopranos 
 The Tonight Show with Jay Leno 
 The Tudors 
 Treme 
 Two and a Half Men 
 Winners & Losers Without a Trace 
 Women's Murder Club 
 Workaholics 
 The Big Bang Theory rerun 
 A Young Doctor's Notebook (TV series) rerun 
 Hannibal (TV series) rerun
 Vikings (2013 TV series) rerun
 Parade's End (TV series)''

Sources

External links
Official page
E2 at LyngSat Address

Defunct television channels in Turkey
Television channels and stations established in 2007
Television channels and stations disestablished in 2016
2007 establishments in Turkey
2016 disestablishments in Turkey
Doğuş Group